Fermin Alberto Ramas, better known as Kevin Ramas (born October 30, 1967) is a former PBA player for more than twelve years. He has played for Purefoods Tender Juicy Hotdogs, San Miguel Beermen, Pepsi Mega and Alaska Milkmen (now known as the Alaska Aces).

Ramas played for the Mapua Cardinals in the NCAA where he was part of the senior's championship conquest in 1990. He also played for Crispa 400 in the Philippine Basketball League. In 1992, Ramas entered the PBA draft and was picked fourth overall in the first round by Purefoods, behind three members of the national team, Vergel Meneses, Stevenson Solomon and Jolly Escobar.

After two seasons with the Hotdogs, Ramas finds himself being traded for the next two years, first with San Miguel Beermen whom he was dealt for Bong Ravena, the following year, the Beermen gave him up along with Alvin Teng in a trade with Pepsi Mega for Victor Pablo and Gido Babilonia.

Kevin found a home with the Alaska Milkmen where he was part of the grandslam team in 1996 and multiple championships after with the Milkmen.

Trivia
He was nicknamed "Kevin" since his build and shoulders in his early years resembled that of NBA legend Kevin McHale

References

Living people
Filipino men's basketball players
TNT Tropang Giga players
Mapúa Cardinals basketball players
1967 births
Magnolia Hotshots players
San Miguel Beermen players
Alaska Aces (PBA) players
Magnolia Hotshots draft picks